Fantastix II Next is an EP by J-pop duo Two-Mix, released by King Records on March 4, 1998. It includes the single "Time Distortion", which was used as the ending theme of the TBS variety show King's Brunch. As the direct follow-up to the duo's fourth album Fantastix, the EP's track listing starts at number 14.

The album peaked at No. 10 on Oricon's weekly albums chart.

Track listing 
All lyrics are written by Shiina Nagano; all music is composed by Minami Takayama, except where indicated; all music is arranged by Two-Mix, except where indicated.

Charts

References

External links 
 
 

1998 EPs
Two-Mix albums
Japanese-language EPs
King Records (Japan) EPs